John Bailie Reese (23 April 1877 – 26 January 1971) was a New Zealand cricketer. He played in two first-class matches for Canterbury in 1900/01. He was a son of Daniel Reese and two of his brothers were also prominent in cricket: Tom Reese and Dan Reese. His youngest brother, Andrew Reese, was an architect; he was killed in action in 1917.

Reese died on 26 January 1971 and was buried at Ruru Lawn Cemetery.

See also
 List of Canterbury representative cricketers

References

External links
 

1877 births
1971 deaths
New Zealand cricketers
Canterbury cricketers
Cricketers from Christchurch
Burials at Ruru Lawn Cemetery